Charles Franklin Dunbar (1830 – 1900) was an American  economist. He held the first Chair of Political Economy at the Harvard University in 1871.

He graduated from Harvard University in 1851. From 1885 to 1898 he served as a trustee and later as president of the Board of Trustees of Phillips Exeter Academy. Dunbar Hall, a dormitory on that school's campus, was named after him in 1901, as was its replacement after it was destroyed by fire in 1907.

Works

References

External links 
 

1900 deaths
1830 births
Harvard University faculty
19th-century American economists
Political economists
Presidents of the American Economic Association
Harvard University alumni